OOA may mean:

 Object-oriented analysis
 Old Order Amish
 Open-ocean aquaculture
 Out of Africa
 Out of Africa theory
 Out of Area
 The Legend of Zelda: Oracle of Ages, a video game

See also 
 OA (disambiguation)
 OO (disambiguation)
 Out of Africa (disambiguation)